Espionage Agent is a pre–World War II spy melodrama produced by Hal B. Wallis in 1939. Directed by Lloyd Bacon, Espionage Agent, like many Warner Bros. movies, clearly identifies the Germans as the enemy. This was unlike many other movie studios during this period that did not want to antagonize foreign governments.

The film was released on September 22, 1939, the day after President Franklin D. Roosevelt signed the Neutrality Act allowing "Cash and Carry" provisions for countries fighting Germany and a little over four months after another Warner Bros. anti-Nazi film Confessions of a Nazi Spy.

Plot
The film opens with a description of the Black Tom explosion of a munitions supply located in Jersey City on the Hudson River. The explosion, which occurred during World War I was an act of sabotage by German agents.

Barry Corvall (Joel McCrea), the son of a recently deceased American diplomat, has just got married. When he discovers that his new wife (Brenda Marshall) is a possible enemy agent, he resigns from the diplomatic service to go undercover to expose an espionage ring planning to destroy American industrial capability before war breaks out.
 
Traveling on a train in Germany, Corvall attempts to steal a briefcase with documents in an attempt to prove that the Nazis have been infiltrating vital industrial centers in the United States. With the help of his wife, he tries to foil the plans of the Nazi spy (Martin Kosleck).

Cast
 Joel McCrea as Barry Corvall
 Brenda Marshall as Brenda Ballard
 Jeffrey Lynn as Lowell Warrington
 George Bancroft as Dudley Garrett
 Stanley Ridges as Hamilton Peyton
 James Stephenson as Dr. Anton Rader
 Howard C. Hickman as Walter Forbes
 Martin Kosleck as Karl Mullen
 Nana Bryant as Mrs. Corvall
 Rudolph Anders as Paul Strawn
 Hans Heinrich von Twardowski as Dr. Helm
 Lucien Prival as Decker
 Addison Richards as Bruce Corvall
 Edwin Stanley as Secretary of State
 Granville Bates as Phineas T. O'Grady

Bans
The film was banned in Norway in January 1940. The Norwegian authorities did not provide any reason for the ban just issuing the following statement: The film above is not approved for public viewing in Norway.

References

External links
 
 
 
 

1939 films
American black-and-white films
American World War II propaganda films
Films directed by Lloyd Bacon
Films scored by Adolph Deutsch
American spy drama films
Warner Bros. films
1930s spy drama films
Melodrama films
1939 drama films
1940s English-language films
1930s English-language films
1930s American films
Film censorship in Norway